This article presents the Demographic history of Slovenia, with census results where available. See Demographics of Slovenia for a more detailed overview of the current demographics from 2002 census.

Pre WWII
There are censuses for the years 1830, 1857, and 1869. Population censuses were then carried out every ten years, in 1880, 1890, 1900, 1910, 1921, and 1931.

1830
Slovenia was divided between the Austrian regions of Carniola, Austrian Littoral, Styria and Carinthia, not counting the Hungarian-owned Prekmurje region. In Styria, there were 342,013 Slovenians, or 38.72% of the population   .

Second half of 19th century
As a result of the rise of German nationalism, which entailed germanizing school networks, economic coercion, and language shift for economic or social reasons, the number of Slovenians in Slovenia went from 96% in 1846, 85.5% in 1880, 84.6% in 1890 and 87.3% in 1900 to 81.7% in 1910. These developments were particularly visible in southern Carinthia, today mostly a part of Austria, largely due to the developing tourist industry on the lakes of the Klagenfurt basin. Similar developments took place in the Prekmurje region, which was then a part of Royal Hungary, with Hungarian replacing German as the prestigious language.

1910
Data shows the following results... 
82% Slovenians
10% Germans (106,000)
2% Italians
1.5% Hungarians

Interwar Period

1921
In the first census of the former Yugoslavia in 1921. The area of the Drava Banovina had the following groups... they were counted according to their mother tongue...
1,054,919 total, of which the following language groups were...
980,222 Slovenian
41,514 German
14,429 Hungarian
11,898 Serbian and Croatian
2,941 Czechoslovakian
1,630 Russian
701 Italian
others

1931
In Yugoslavia in 1931 only religious groups were counted. The Drava Banovina had...
1,144,298 total, of which...
1,107,155 Catholic
25,717 Lutheran/Protestant
6,745 Orthodox
927 Islam
3,754 others

Post WWII

1948
1,391,873 total, of which...
1,350,149 (97.00%) Slovenians
16,069 (1.15%) Croats
10,579 (0.76%) Hungarians
7,048 (0.51%) Serbs

1953
1,466,425 total, of which...
1,415,448 (96,52%) Slovenians
17,978 (1.26%) Croats
11,225 (0.76%) Serbs
11,019 (0.75%) Hungarians
1,663 (0.11%) Romani people
1,617 (0.75%) ethnic Muslims
1,356 (0.09%) Montenegrins
others

1961
1,591,523 total, of which...
1,522,248 (95.65%) Slovenians
31,429 (1.97%) Croats
13,609 (0.85%) Serbs
10,498 (0.66%) Hungarians
2,784 (0.17%) Yugoslavs
1,384 (0.09%) Montenegrins
1,009 (0.06%) Macedonians
13,425 (0.71%) ethnic Muslims
others

1971
1,727,137 total, of which...
1,624,029 (94.03%) Slovenians
42,657 (2.47%) Croats
20,521 (1.19%) Serbs
9,785 (0.57%) Hungarians
6,744 (0.39%) Yugoslavs
3,231 (0.19%) ethnic Muslims
1,978 (0.11%) Montenegrins
1,613 (0.09%) Macedonians
1,281 (0.07%) Albanians
others

1981
1,891,864 total, of which...
1,712,445 (94.03%) Slovenians
55,625 (2.94%) Croats
42,182 (2.23%) Serbs
26,263 (1.39%) Yugoslavs
13,425 (0.71%) ethnic Muslims
9,496 (0.50%) Hungarians
3,288 (0.17%) Macedonians
3,217 (0.17%) Montenegrins
1,985 (0.10%) Albanians
1,435 (0.08%) Romani people
others

1991
1,913,355 total, of which...
1,689,657 (88.30%) Slovenians
52,876 (2.76%) Croats
47,401 (2.47%) Serbs
26,577 (1.38%) ethnic Muslims
12,075 (0.63%) Yugoslavs
8,000 (0.41%) Hungarians
others

Post Independence

2002
1,964,036 total, of which...
1,631,363 (83.06%) Slovenians
38,964 (1.98%) Serbs
35,642 (1.81%) Croats
21,542 (1.10%) Bosniaks
10,467 (0.53%) ethnic Muslims
6,243 (0.32%) Hungarians
6,186 (0.31%) Albanians
others

External links
 Demography and Social Statistics of Slovenia, SURS
 Results of the 2002 census, SURS

Geographic history of Slovenia
Society of Slovenia
Slovenia